F